Moses Pierce Kinkaid (January 24, 1856 – July 6, 1922) was an American politician who was a member of the United States House of Representatives from the state of Nebraska.

Early life and career
Kinkaid was born near Morgantown, Virginia, which is now in West Virginia. As a boy, he piloted Canada-bound fugitive slaves to his grandparents' home in Pennsylvania, where food, shelter, and aid were given to them. He attended the public schools and graduated from the law department of the University of Michigan at Ann Arbor in 1876. He was admitted to the bar and practiced in Henry County, Illinois, from 1876 until 1880 and in Pierre, Dakota Territory in 1880 and 1881. In 1881, he moved to O'Neill, Nebraska, where he maintained his residence until his death.

In O'Neill, Kinkaid continued to practice law.  He also served as an officer of the Holt County Bank from its foundation in 1884 until 1886. He served in the state Senate in 1883, and as a district judge from 1887 to 1900.

In 1900, Kinkaid unsuccessfully sought election to the U.S. House of Representatives from Nebraska's Sixth District. In 1902, he ran for the same position, this time successfully.

Kinkaid Act
The Sixth District contained most of the Nebraska Sandhills. This is a region of grass-stabilized sand dunes. Rainfall percolates readily into the sandy soil, recharging the aquifer and giving rise to hundreds of permanent lakes; but the sandy soil is poorly suited for cultivation, and the area is chiefly used for cattle ranching.

At the time that Kinkaid entered Congress, the 1862 Homestead Act allowed settlers to obtain a quarter-section (160 acres, or 65 ha) of government land for a nominal fee; the 1873 Timber Culture Act allowed them to claim an additional quarter-section.
However, in much of the Sandhills, a half-section was not enough land to sustain a family.
Instead, the pattern of development was one of large cattle ranches on federal land, with the ranchers using the homestead laws to secure lakes and streams for their operations.

In an effort to increase settlement in the northwestern portion of his state, Kinkaid sponsored and obtained passage of the Kinkaid Act, which amended the Homestead Act to enlarge the size of a homestead claim in certain arid regions of western Nebraska. The measure was signed by President Theodore Roosevelt in 1904.

The Act had its intended effect: immigration into the Sandhills increased, with nearly nine million new acres claimed in Nebraska. By 1912, most of the land available had been claimed by "Kinkaiders". Attempts to farm the land thus obtained generally failed; but Kinkaid claims, together with regulations prohibiting fencing of federal land, led to the replacement of a few large ranches in the Sandhills with many smaller ones. The outcome of the Nebraska law led to the passage of the 1916 Stock-Raising Homestead Act, which extended many of the provisions of the Kinkaid act to other Western states.

Later life and legacy
Kinkaid held his Congressional seat as a Republican until his death. In the 66th and 67th Congresses (1919–1922), he was Chairman of the Committee on Irrigation of Arid Lands. He died in Washington, D.C., on July 6, 1922, shortly before the end of his tenth term in office.
He was buried in Prospect Hill Cemetery in O'Neill, Nebraska.

The Old Nebraska State Bank Building in O'Neill, in which Kinkaid had his law office from 1884 until his death, is now the Holt County Historical Museum. It is listed in the National Register of Historic Places. 
Kinkaid's office has been restored and is on display.

The Kinkaider Brewing Company in Broken Bow, Nebraska, was named in honor of the congressman and the "Kinkaiders" who settled this area of the state.

In 1963, he was inducted into the Hall of Great Westerners of the National Cowboy & Western Heritage Museum.

See also

List of United States Congress members who died in office (1900–49)

References

External links
 
 Moses P. Kinkaid Law Office Museum (O'Neill, Nebraska)
 
 Moses P. Kinkaid, late a representative from Nebraska, Memorial addresses delivered in the House of Representatives frontispiece 1924

1856 births
1922 deaths
Republican Party Nebraska state senators
Nebraska lawyers
Politicians from Morgantown, West Virginia
People from O'Neill, Nebraska
University of Michigan Law School alumni
Republican Party members of the United States House of Representatives from Nebraska
19th-century American lawyers
Lawyers from Morgantown, West Virginia